Paul de Foix de Carmain (1528–1584) was a French prelate and diplomat. He was son of Jean de Foix, comte de Carmain, by his wife Aldonce.  He studied Greek and Roman literature at Paris, and jurisprudence at Toulouse, where shortly after finishing his curriculum he delivered a course of lectures on civil law, which gained him great reputation.

At the age of nineteen he was named councillor of the parlement of Paris. He was arrested on suspicion of harbouring Huguenot sympathies, but escaped punishment, and subsequently regained the favour of the French court.

At the end of 1561 he was sent ambassador to England, where he remained four years. He went to Scotland to visit Mary, Queen of Scots in December 1561.

He was then sent to Venice, and returned a short time afterwards to England to negotiate a marriage between Queen Elizabeth and the duke of Anjou. He again fulfilled several important missions during the reign of Henry III of France. In 1577 he was made archbishop of Toulouse, and in 1579 was appointed ambassador to Rome, where he remained till his death.

Les Lettres de Messire de Paul de Foix, archevesque de Toloze et ambassadeur pour le roy aupres du pape Gregoire XIII, au roi Henry III, were published in 1628, but there are some doubts as to their authenticity.

In fiction
In the 1998 film Elizabeth, he was portrayed by Eric Cantona.

References
Gallia Christiana (1715 seq.)
Marc Antoine Muret, Oraison funèbre de Paul de Foix (Paris, 1584)
"Lettres de Catherine de Medicis," edited by Hector de la Ferrière (Paris, 1880 seq.) in the Collection de documents inedits sur l'histoire de France.

1528 births
1584 deaths
Archbishops of Toulouse
16th-century Roman Catholic archbishops in France
16th-century French diplomats
People of the Tudor period
French nobility
Ambassadors of France to England